Pearl Binder, Baroness Elwyn-Jones (pronounced ; 28 June 1904 – 25 January 1990) was a British writer, illustrator, stained-glass artist, lithographer, sculptor and a champion of the Pearly Kings and Queens.

Binder was a well-known character who had a lifelong fascination with the East End of London, where she settled in the 1920s. In 1974, she became Lady Elwyn-Jones, when her husband, the politician and lawyer Elwyn Jones, was appointed Lord Chancellor and made a life peer, taking the title Baron Elwyn-Jones.

Early life
Pearl "Polly" Binder was born in Salford in Greater Manchester. Her father was Jacob Binderevski, a Jewish tailor who came to Britain in 1890 and shortly afterwards became a British citizen. Her mother's name, origins and profession are not recorded in any of the artist's biographies.

Career
Binder moved to London after the first world war and studied art at Central School of Art and Design, with a focus on lithography. In this time Binder drew scenes from everyday life in London that she made into lithographs. She published a series that illustrated "The Real East End" by Thomas Burke, a popular writer who ran a pub in Poplar at the time. Binder's illustrations are an intimate, first-hand portrayal of grimy London life in that era. In 1933 Binder was one of the founders of the left-wing Artists' International Association.

In 1937, Binder was involved in the earliest days of television broadcasting for children. That year, she co-presented Clothes-Line with the fashion historian James Laver. This live six-part series was the first television programme on the history of fashion. As she did not give birth to her daughter Josephine until 6 January 1938 – less than a month after the last episode transmitted – Binder could well have been the first heavily pregnant woman to appear on television.

In the course of her life, Binder travelled extensively in Russia and China, designed a musical, designed costumes for a theatre company, wrote stories for children, designed a Pearly mug and plate for Wedgwood, and instigated and executed a series of armorial windows at the House of Lords.

Personal life
In 1937, she married Elwyn Jones. They had three children: fashion historian Lou Taylor, artist and activist Dan Jones, and the children's author Josephine Gladstone, whose books she illustrated. After her death, her son-in-law, Joe Taylor recalled, "She was a woman who had great concern for others, especially women - she was a very keen supporter of women's rights", always keeping the name Pearl Binder next to her husband's name on the plaque outside their flat.

Death
Binder died in Brighton on 25 January 1990 aged 86, seven weeks after the death of her husband.

Publications

As illustrator

As author and illustrator

 – Japanese translation of Dressing up, dressing down

References

External links

 Artwork by Pearl Binder at the Ben Uri site

1904 births
1990 deaths
20th-century British sculptors
20th-century British printmakers
20th-century English women artists
Alumni of the Central School of Art and Design
Elwyn-Jones
British stained glass artists and manufacturers
English children's writers
English lithographers
English people of Russian-Jewish descent
English people of Ukrainian-Jewish descent
English television personalities
English women sculptors
Jewish women artists
People from Salford
Spouses of life peers
Women lithographers
20th-century lithographers